Robert William Packwood (born September 11, 1932) is an American retired lawyer and politician from Oregon and a member of the Republican Party. He resigned from the United States Senate, under threat of expulsion, in 1995 after allegations of sexual harassment, abuse and assault of women emerged.

Seen as a moderate-to-liberal Republican, Packwood served alongside Mark Hatfield for his entire tenure in the Senate.

Early life and career
Packwood was born in Portland, Oregon, graduated from Grant High School in 1950, and in 1954 graduated from Willamette University in Salem.

Packwood is the great-grandson of William H. Packwood, the youngest member of the Oregon Constitutional Convention of 1857. Packwood had his great-grandfather's political bent from his early years. During his undergraduate years, he participated in Young Republican activities and worked on political campaigns, including later Governor and US Senator Mark Hatfield's first run for the Oregon House of Representatives. He received the Root-Tilden Scholarship to New York University's Law School, where he earned national awards in moot court competition and was elected student body president. After graduating from the NYU Law School in 1957, he was admitted to the bar and practiced law in Portland.

State legislative career

In 1960, he was elected Chairman of the Multnomah County Republican Central Committee, thus becoming the youngest party chairman of a major metropolitan area in the country. In 1962, he became the youngest member of the Oregon Legislature when he was elected to the Oregon House of Representatives after a campaign waged by what The Oregonian called "one of the most effective working organizations in many an election moon in Oregon." Hundreds of volunteers went door-to-door distributing leaflets throughout the district and put up lawn signs that became "literally a geographical feature" of the district. Because of the effectiveness of his own campaigns, Packwood was selected to organize a political action committee that recruited attractive Republican candidates for the Oregon House throughout the state, and trained them in "Packwood-style" campaigning methods. The success of his candidates was credited with the Republican takeover of the Oregon House, thus making Oregon the only state in the Union in which the Republicans were able to score a significant victory in 1964.

He was a member of the Oregon House of Representatives from 1963 to 1968. In 1965, he founded the Dorchester Conference, an annual political conclave on the Oregon coast that "pointedly ignored state leadership in the Grand Old Party" to bring Republican officeholders and citizens together to discuss current issues and pass resolutions taking stands on those issues. Initially a forum for liberal politics, it has become an annual networking event for Oregon Republicans.

U.S. Senator

In 1968, Packwood was nominated to run for the U.S. Senate in Oregon as the Republican candidate against Democratic incumbent Wayne Morse. Morse had been elected to the Senate as a Republican in 1944 and 1950, then switched parties due to his liberal views, and was easily reelected as a Democrat in 1956 and 1962. The relatively unknown Packwood was given little chance, but after an 11th-hour debate with the incumbent before the City Club of Portland, which Packwood was generally considered to have won, and a statewide recount in which over 100,000 ballots were challenged by both parties, Packwood was declared the winner by 3,500 votes. Packwood replaced Senator Ted Kennedy as the youngest senator. Packwood was reelected in 1974, 1980, 1986, and 1992.

Packwood's voting record was moderate. He supported restrictions on gun owners and liberal civil rights legislation. Packwood voted in favor of the bill establishing Martin Luther King Jr. Day as a federal holiday and the Civil Rights Restoration Act of 1987 (as well as to override President Reagan's veto).

Packwood differed with President Richard Nixon on some significant issues. He voted against Nixon's Supreme Court nominees Clement Haynsworth and G. Harrold Carswell, as well as Nixon's proposals for the B-1 bomber, submarines capable of carrying the Trident missile and the supersonic transport (SST). He became the first Senate Republican to support Nixon's impeachment. In a White House meeting on November 15, 1973, he told Nixon that the public no longer believed him and no longer trusted the integrity of the administration.

Two years before the Roe v. Wade decision by the Supreme Court, he introduced the Senate's first abortion legalization bill, but he was unable to attract a cosponsor for it. His pro-choice stance earned him the loyalty of many feminist groups and numerous awards including those from the Planned Parenthood Federation of America (January 10, 1983) and the National Women's Political Caucus (October 23, 1985). In 1987, Packwood crossed party lines to vote against the nomination of Robert Bork to the Supreme Court, and he was one of only two Republicans to vote against the nomination of Clarence Thomas to the court in 1991. Both votes were based on the nominee's opposition to abortion rights.

He played a major role in the enactment of the Hells Canyon National Recreation Area Act, sponsoring a bill which protected scenic Hells Canyon, the deepest river gorge in North America, by making it into a  National Recreation Area on the borders of northeastern Oregon and western Idaho. Environmentalists also praised his advocacy of solar energy, returnable bottles, and bike paths.

Deregulation was another interest of Packwood's. In the late 1970s, he became a passionate supporter of trucking deregulation and a "persuasive spokesman" for reform.

He has been described as an "ardent" pro-Israel supporter. He opposed a sale of F-15s to Saudi Arabia under President Reagan.

He was most noted for his role in the 1986 tax reform while he was chairman of the Senate Finance Committee. President Ronald Reagan had proposed the idea of tax reform in 1984, but Packwood's initial response was indifferent.  However, he played a leading role in fashioning a tax code that would raise business taxes by some $120 billion over five years and lower personal income taxes by roughly the same amount.

Packwood's debating skills were rated A+ by USA Today in the issue of July 18, 1986. But his debating and legislative skills could kill bills as well as pass them. His floor management has been credited with killing President Clinton's 1993 health care bill. And he could be stubborn; in 1988 he was carried feet-first into the Senate Chamber by Capitol Police for a quorum call on campaign finance reform legislation.

Resignation

Sexual misconduct as a U.S. Senator
Packwood's political career began to unravel in November 1992, when a Washington Post story detailed claims of sexual abuse and assault from ten women, chiefly former staffers and lobbyists. Publication of the story was delayed until after the 1992 election, as Packwood had denied the allegations and the Post had not gathered enough information about the story at the time. Packwood defeated the Democratic nominee, Representative Les AuCoin, 52.1% to 46.5%–easily his closest race since his initial run for the seat a quarter-century earlier. Eventually, 19 women came forward.

As the situation developed, Packwood's diary became an issue. Wrangling over whether the diary could be subpoenaed and whether it was protected by the Fifth Amendment's protection against self-incrimination ensued. He did divulge 5,000 pages to the Senate Ethics Committee but balked when a further 3,200 pages were demanded by the committee. It was discovered that he had edited the diary, removing what were allegedly references to sexual encounters and the sexual abuse allegations made against him. Packwood then made what some of his colleagues interpreted as a threat to expose wrongdoing by other members of Congress. The diary allegedly detailed some of his abusive behavior toward women and, according to a press statement made by Richard Bryan, at that time serving as senator from Nevada, "raised questions about possible violations of one or more laws, including criminal laws".

Expulsion recommendation and resignation
Despite pressure for open hearings from the public and from female Senators, especially Barbara Boxer from California, the Senate ultimately decided against them. The Ethics Committee's indictment, running to ten volumes and 10,145 pages, much of it from Packwood's own writings, according to a report in The New York Times, detailed the sexual misconduct, obstruction of justice, and ethics charges being made against him. The chairman of the Ethics Committee, Republican senator Mitch McConnell, referred to Packwood's "habitual pattern of aggressive, blatantly sexual advances, mostly directed at members of his own staff or others whose livelihoods were connected in some way to his power and authority as a Senator" and said Packwood's behavior included "deliberately altering and destroying relevant portions of his diary" that Packwood himself had described in the diary as "very incriminating information". On September 7, the committee unanimously recommended that Packwood be expelled from the Senate.

The following morning, the committee released its findings. With bipartisan pressure mounting, Packwood announced his resignation from the Senate, saying that he was "aware of the dishonor that has befallen me in the last three years" and his "duty to resign." Democratic Representative Ron Wyden won the seat in a special election.

After the sexual harassment case came to light, Packwood entered the Hazelden Foundation clinic for alcoholism in Minnesota, blaming his drinking for the harassments.

Four years later, during debate on President Clinton's impeachment, McConnell said that the Republicans knew that it was very likely Packwood's seat would fall to the Democrats if Packwood were forced out. However, McConnell said, he and his fellow Republicans felt that it came down to a choice of "retain the Senate seat or retain our honor."

After the U.S. Senate
Soon after leaving the Senate, Packwood founded the lobbying firm Sunrise Research Corporation. The former senator used his expertise in taxes and trade and his status as a former Senate Finance Committee chairman to land lucrative contracts with numerous clients, among them Northwest Airlines, Freightliner Corp. and Marriott International Inc. Among other projects, he played a key role in the 2001 fight to repeal the estate tax. In 2015, Packwood returned to the Senate as a witness for the Senate Finance Committee, which was again considering tax reform. He and Bill Bradley spoke on the 1986 Tax Reform bill.

See also
 List of United States senators expelled or censured
 List of American federal politicians convicted of crimes
 List of federal political sex scandals in the United States
 List of federal political scandals in the United States

References

External links
 
 
 Text of the Senate's resolution for investigation, May 17, 1995.
 "Packwood Is Leaving As a Pariah In His State", The New York Times
 Speech by Robert Packwood given on November 3, 1969. Audio recording from The University of Alabama's Emphasis Symposium on Contemporary Issues
 

|-

|-

|-

|-

|-

|-

|-

|-

|-

1932 births
American Unitarian Universalists
Grant High School (Portland, Oregon) alumni
Living people
Republican Party members of the Oregon House of Representatives
New York University School of Law alumni
Oregon lawyers
Republican Party United States senators from Oregon
St. Mark's School (Massachusetts) alumni
Willamette University alumni
Members of Congress who became lobbyists